Ksar (1918–1937) was a French Thoroughbred racehorse who had back-to-back wins in France's most prestigious horse race, the Prix de l'Arc de Triomphe.

Breeding
Bred by Evremond de Saint-Alary at his Haras de Saint Pair du Mont in Normandy, Ksar was purchased by the renowned French horseman Edmond Blanc. Ksar was inbred to the French Derby winner, Omnium II (3f x 2f) with this giving him three crosses of Dollar (4f x 5m x 6m). Kizil Kourgan was the winner of the  French 1000 Guineas and Oaks, the Grand Prix de Paris and other races.  Her first foal was Kenilworth, by Childwick. Kenilworth won the Prix Greffulhe, Prix Rainbow and the marathon four mile (6,400 metres) race, Prix Gladiateur before being exported to Australia and becoming a successful sire. He was a direct male descendant of the famous mid-nineteenth century race horse The Flying Dutchman.

Racing record
Edmond Blanc died in 1920, and his widow raced Ksar, beginning at age two when he won the Prix de la Salamandre at Longchamp Racecourse.

At age three, Ksar was the dominant horse in France, winning five major races, including the coveted Prix du Jockey Club and the first of his two consecutive Prix de l'Arc de Triomphes. He ran poorly in the 1921 Grand Prix de Paris which had previously been won by both Ksar's sire and dam.

Ksar continued his dominance at age four, winning his second Arc and adding the Grand Prix de Saint-Cloud (Prix du President de la Republique). Ksar was retired after his four-year-old racing season with 11 wins and 3 places from his 15 starts.

Stud record
At his owner's Haras de Jardy, stud, Ksar was the leading sire in France in 1931 and an influential sire.

Notable progeny includes
 Diademe, who won in England and France,
 Le Ksar (2,000 Guineas, stood in England from 1939 to 1943 and then exported to Argentina)
Maravilla a successful Spanish broodmare.
 Thor II (French Derby, French Gold Cup, second in the Ascot Gold Cup defeating Hyperion).
 Tourbillon (1928), who won the French Derby and contributed to many modern pedigrees
Ukrania, won Prix de Diane and the
 Ut Majeur (Cesare-witch, etc., sent to Hungary in 1936 after three or four seasons at stud in England);
 Yema (dam of the 2000 Guineas winner Kingsway)

Among Ksar's grandsons are Prix de l'Arc de Triomphe winners Djebel (1942) and Caracalla (1946). Ksar was also the damsire of the 1941 Arc winner and Three-Year-Old Champion Le Pacha.

In 1935, Ksar was sold to American breeding interests and stood at stud at Montana Hall Stud in Virginia, where he produced a number of international show jumping horses until his death in 1937 at age nineteen.

Pedigree

Sire line tree

Ksar
Magnat
Amfortas
One I Love
Clodouche
Nuageux
Minotchehr
Pegase
Ut Majeur
Tourbillon
Serdab
Goya
Goyama
Gombar
Patras
Tenareze
Vittor Pasani
Sourire
Nirgal
Nail
Dariel
Giafar
Oman
Dusky Oman
Impresario
Sandjar
Jardiniere
Ogan
Eylau
Goyaz
Obagoy
Gyn
Rapaz
Sultan El Yago
Damasco
Good Luck
L'Aiglon
Goma
Orbaneja
Major's Dilemma
Pintor
Marcius
Cillas
Gaspillage
Last Post
Kobus
Adaris
Billy of Spain
Meridien
Manitou
Medium
Master Boing
Misti
Sphinx
Djebel
Arbar
Abdos
Arcor
Clarion
Klairon
Rumesnil
Pantene
Net
Le Francais
Djelal
Le Lavandou
Le Levanstell
Le Roitelet
Damnos
Dernah
Djebe
Blast
Joy
Djebelilla
Dyur
Djeddah
Midsummer Night
Djefou
Rapace
Le Sanglier
Puissant Chef
Courroux
My Babu
Better Boy
Dante
Eubulides
Our Babu
Babur
Dionisio
Milesian
King Babar
Primera
Shearwater
The Hammer
Babu
Babu Dancer
Bronze Babu
Crozier
Prudent
Babu's On
Cantaber
Cantab
Djafar
Marveil
Roc Du Diable
Targui
Oreka
Cadiz
Sol D'Or
Zinder
Tardini
Cardanil
Emperor
Galcador
Djemlah
Liberator
Nyangal
Caporal
Rush
Argur
Arturo A.
Esteno
Astyanax
Korok
Myjavan
Candaules
Pharel
Giramundi
Entente Cordiale
Jaddo
Diacano
Hugh Lupus
Hethersett
Lupus
Signal Rocket
Clouet
Tiber
Olean
Atlas
Floriados
Ace of Clubs
Tartan Ace
Wirbelwind
Kaliber
Don Carlos
Ringo
Xanthor
Tornado
Fontenay
Le Beau Prince
Tropique
Saim
Gelsemium
Lacaduv
Pier Capponi
Aquino
Cedric
Mister Tory
Fontenoy
Robot
Tosco
Tracy
Magabit
Paraje
Tyrone
Le Mesnil
Mr. Tor
Thymus
Tiepoletto
Tiepolo
Micipsa
Le Volcan
Triguero
Tarzan
Milord
Amoretto
Caracalla II
Claudius
Coaraze
Canthare
Emerson
Emerilo
Rimesault
Solicitor
Rhone
Djask
Cadir
Pantheon
Timor
Tahoe
Tai
Pronto
Indian Chief
Practicante
Utopico
Primed
Tourment
Chingacgook
Nic
Han D'Island
Zagros
Kaiserstuhl
Oktavio
Carlos Primero
Violon D'Ingres
Montal
Vitaner
Amasis
Tournoi
Turmoil
Popof III
Escart III
L'Escargot
Garoupe
Bontur
Tajon
Ambiorix
Ambler
Gray Phantom
Ambehaving
Ampose
More Scents
Augustus Bay
Good Behaving
Amber Morn
Count Amber
Amberoid
Ambiopoise
Faraway Son
Twice Worthy
Hitting Away
Sheet Anchor
Mountdrago
Pleasure Seeker
Blue Fox
Charleval
Cagire
El Toro
Homer
Fort Napoleon
Devon
Estheta
Magnific
Tournai
Terrington
Touragua
Frisco
Franjezco
Principe Duero
Anglo
Pongo
Ricky
Donagua
Snobissimo
Ragazzo
Koku
Datour
Dare
Thor
Tariel
Tarbrag
Taslip
Tajo
Imperator
Ofelus
Oferista
Muzio
Pas Libre
Peter the Great
Russian Hero
Formor
Fortina
Fortria
Bampton Castle
Fort Leney
Splash
Fort Devon
Le Ksar
Malkowicze
Zurs
Sampiera
Castel Fusano
Ksar of Audley
Wire-tapper

References

External links
 Ksar at Thoroughbred Heritage

1918 racehorse births
1937 racehorse deaths
Racehorses bred in Calvados (department)
Racehorses trained in France
Arc winners
Champion Thoroughbred Sires of France
Thoroughbred family 3-n
Byerley Turk sire line